Rous County is one of the 141 Cadastral divisions of New South Wales. It is located at the north-east tip of the state. It is bordered on the north by the border with Queensland and on the south by the Richmond River. It contains Lismore, Byron Bay and Murwillumbah.

Rous County was named in honour of Admiral Henry John Rous (1795-1877).

Parishes within this county
A full list of parishes found within this county; their current LGA and mapping coordinates to the approximate centre of each location is as follows:

Dunoon dam proposal
The council has been aware of Indigenous concerns since the matter was first considered in the 1990s, and was committed to working with local communities to mitigate concerns. An impact assessment of the site had identified various artefacts and burial sites in the area.

References

Counties of New South Wales
Northern Rivers